Walter Hobson was an English footballer who played as a centre-half for Owlerton, Sheffield United, The Wednesday and Rotherham Town.

Playing career
Hobson was amongst the first players to sign for newly formed Sheffield United after responding to adverts placed in the local press. Having started his career at local rivals The Wednesday he was signed in August 1889 from another local side Owlerton, where he had been club captain. He was a regular in The Blades' first season which was primarily made up of friendly fixtures but also played seven games in the FA Cup.

Leaving United only one year after signing Hobson returned to Owlerton until moving to Rotherham Town where he made his Football League debut in 1893, despite nearing the end of his career.

References

Year of birth missing
Place of birth missing
Association football defenders
English footballers
Owlerton F.C. players
Sheffield Wednesday F.C. players
Sheffield United F.C. players
Rotherham Town F.C. (1878) players
English Football League players